SPCA, or Secretory Pathway Ca2+-ATPase, is a calcium ATPase-type P-ATPase encoded for by the genes ATP2C1 and ATP2C2.

Function
SPCA is found primarily in the membranes of the golgi apparatus in increasing concentrations from the cis- to the trans-golgi compartments. Following a calcium spike, SPCA proteins are responsible for transporting Ca2+ ions from the cytosol to the lumen of the golgi, thus lowering the cytoplasmic concentrations of Ca2+ to resting levels.

SPCA is also able to transport Mn2+ ions into the golgi with high affinity, an ability that the related Ca2+-ATPase, SERCA, does not possess. Since Mn2+ ions are not used for signalling like Ca2+ ions are, the main reason for transporting them out of the cytosol is to prevent manganese toxicity.

The removal of these ions from the cytosol can also be looked upon as supplying the golgi apparatus and thus the entire secretory pathway with these ions. Several proteins within the pathway require either Ca2+ ions, Mn2+ ions, or divalent ions to function as metal cofactors, such as aminopeptidase P, Proprotein convertases and sulfotransferases.

References

Transmembrane proteins